In Christianity, an unreached people group refers to an ethnic group without an indigenous, self-propagating Christian church movement. Any ethnic or ethnolinguistic nation without enough Christians to evangelize the rest of the nation is an "unreached people group". It is a missiological term used by Evangelical Protestants.   
The Lausanne Committee for World Evangelization defines a people group as "the largest group within which the gospel can spread as a church planting movement without encountering barriers of understanding or acceptance." 
"Nation" is sometimes used interchangeably for "people group".
The term is sometimes applied to ethnic groups in which less than 2% of the population is Evangelical Protestant Christian, Including nations where other forms of Christianity are prevalent such as Western Catholicism, Eastern Christianity or Lutheranism.

See also
 Great Commission
 Uncontacted peoples

References

External links 
 https://joshuaproject.net/help/definitions
 http://www.christianitytoday.com/ct/2003/november/1.44.html?start=4
 https://www.peoplegroups.org/understand/294.aspx#310
 http://www.lausanne.org
 Etnopedia's Definition of a people group

Christian missions
Anthropology